Dean W. Hubbard (July 21, 1953 – March 11, 2018)  was an American musician and professional trombonist. Key credits include developing the "voice" of the teacher, Ms. Othmar on the Charlie Brown Peanuts cartoon and TV specials. He also played with Dizzy Gillespie, Perry Como, Art Pepper, Nelson Riddle, Ella Fitzgerald, Natalie Cole, Peggy Lee, Aaron Neville, Buddy Morrow, Tony Bennett and the SF Orchestra, among others. He is featured on the Gold and Platinum records for Linda Ronstadt's Cry Like a Rainstorm, Howl Like the Wind. He was a lifetime member of the SF Musicians Union and a music instructor

Early life

Dean Hubbard was born in Oakland, California in 1953. He attended Pacific High School in San Leandro. He came from a musical family, often hearing his grandfather play the accordion and his sister play the cello and double bass. Hubbard began playing the trombone in middle school. Versed in all brass, his fondness for the trombone lasted for a lifetime. Coincidentally, his wife, Constance Hubbard, had also played trombone as a middle school and high school student, but made a career in school administration.

Career 
Dean Hubbard's career spanned over 50 years. His early career includes performance work with music standards including Perry Como, Dean Martin, Ella Fitzgerald, Natalie Cole, Peggy Lee, Aaron Neville, Buddy Morrow, Tony Bennett, Joe Strummer and Carol Channing. In addition to audience performance work, he also recorded hundreds of jingles for Chevy, Honda, Hershey's, Hewlett Packard, Rice-a-Roni, and more.

In the mid-1970s through 1990, Hubbard performed on The Charlie Brown and Snoopy Show and all of the Peanuts television specials, including This is America, Charlie Brown, and others. Notably, Hubbard developed the "wah-wah" voice of the teacher in Peanuts, Miss Othmar. "Additionally, Hubbard performed regularly on Garfield and Friends during the first four seasons until the show transitioned to synthesizer sounds and music.

Hubbard also performed with the San Francisco Orchestra and on stage for theater productions in San Francisco. He also performed in several long-standing shows, such as Teatro Zinzanni and others.

In addition to his performance work, Hubbard was a "Master Artist" and  Conn-Selmer Clinician. He also provided instruction for children and experienced musicians. He is cited by professional trombonist, Alan Ferber, as inspiring Ferber's music career with the introduction of a Jamey Aebersold play-along. As Ferber said, "A feeling of joyful disbelief washed over me as I listened and watched...Perhaps a combination of his trombone sound, the ease with which he phrased and moved through the registers, his note choices…whatever it was, it changed the course of my life.   I always think about that moment when I hear the phrase, “you don’t choose music, it chooses you.”"

Discography

References 

1953 births
2018 deaths
American trombonists
Male trombonists
Musicians from Oakland, California